Bistrica is a village in Leposavić municipality, northern Kosovo.

Notes

References

http://xk.geoview.info/bistrica,792588

Serb communities in Kosovo
Villages in Leposavić